The Philippine hawk-owl is a species complex of owls in the family Strigidae. They are all endemic to the Philippines.

Description
The Philippine hawk-owls are earless. The males and females look much alike. They differ in size and pattern on the bottom side. N. reyi and N. spilonota are the biggest and N. philippensis, N. spilocephala and N. mindorensis the smallest. The pattern on the bottom side of N. reyi, N. p. spilonota and N. mindorensis is checked. The pattern on all the other species are striped.

Species range in size (including the tail) to a length of 21.0 to 26.5 cm and have a wingspan of 16.5 to 20.5 cm.

All are species splits from what was once recognized as a single species, N. philippensis, known together as the Philippine hawk-owl. Two of the owls have been recognized in 2012 as distinct species based on vocal and other differences. They were also previously characterized as subspecies.

Systematics and taxonomy
There are seven known species:
 Luzon boobook, ''Ninox philippensis 
 Ninox philippensis centralis (Bohol, Boracay, Carabao, Guimaras, Negros, Panay, Semirara and Siquijor)
 Ninox philippensis philippensis (Biliran, Buad, Catanduanes, Leyte, Luzon, Marinduque, Polillo and Samar)
 Ninox philippensis ticaoensis (Ticao)
 Mindoro boobook, Ninox mindorensis (Mindoro
 Sulu boobook, Ninox reyi (Bongao, Jolo, Sanga Sanga, Siasi, Sibutu and Tawi-Tawi)
 Mindanao boobook, Ninox spilocephala (Basilan, Dinagat, Mindanao and Siargao)
 Romblon boobook, Ninox spilonotus
 Ninox spilonotus spilonotus (Sibuyan)
 Ninox spilonotus fischeri (Tablas)
 Cebu boobook, Ninox rumseyi (Cebu)
 Camiguin boobook, Ninox leventisi (Camiguin)
Locally, this bird is known as kuwago, like other large owls.

Ecology
The Philippine hawk-owl species can be found in forest areas up to an altitude of 1800 metres, although they mostly reside in areas less than 1000 metres above sea level. Natural habitats are subtropical or tropical moist lowland forest and subtropical or tropical moist montane forest. All of the species mate around February. The nests can be found in hollow trees.

References

 Kennedy, R.S., Gonzales P.C., Dickinson E.C., Miranda, Jr, H.C., Fisher T.H. (2000) A Guide to the Birds of the Philippines, Oxford University Press, Oxford.

External links
Image at ADW
Picture from Flickr

Philippine hawk-owl

Taxonomy articles created by Polbot
Bird common names
Taxobox binomials not recognized by IUCN